André Filipe Bernardes Santos (born 2 March 1989) is a Portuguese professional footballer who plays as a defensive midfielder.

Club career

Sporting CP
Born in Sobreiro Curvo, Torres Vedras, Santos joined Sporting CP's youth system at the age of 11. He made his senior debut while on loan, with C.D. Fátima of the third division and U.D. Leiria; in the 2009–10 season, with the latter, he first appeared in the Primeira Liga, playing 30 complete games to help the club finish in ninth place and being the first Portuguese player to achieve the feat in the league in the process.

Santos returned to the Lions for 2010–11, playing his first official match with the side on 5 August in a 2–1 home win against FC Nordsjælland in the UEFA Europa League. He scored his first goal as a professional exactly four months later, helping the visiting team defeat 3–1 Portimonense SC, and finished the campaign with 42 appearances in all competitions (two goals).

On 25 August 2011, also in the Europa League and against the same Danish opponent, and with the same match result but now in the playoff round, Santos netted to eventually help Sporting reach the group stage as that was also the aggregate score. However, he eventually lost his importance in the squad under new manager Domingos Paciência.

In June 2012, Santos moved alongside a host of compatriots – including Sporting teammate Diogo Salomão – to Deportivo de La Coruña from Spain, in a season-long loan. He made his La Liga debut on 1 September by coming on as a late substitute in a 1–1 home draw with Getafe CF, but featured sparingly overall and the Galicians were also relegated.

Later career
On 8 August 2014, after one season back in his homeland with Vitória de Guimarães, Santos changed teams and countries again, joining Balıkesirspor in the Süper Lig. In July 2015, he signed a two-year contract with FC Metz of the French Ligue 2.

Santos spent the better part of the following four campaigns back in the Portuguese top tier, with F.C. Arouca and Belenenses SAD. In between, he served a small loan at Romania's CS Universitatea Craiova.

On 28 August 2020, Santos agreed to a deal at Grasshopper Club Zürich. After two years and promotion to the Swiss Super League in his first season, his two-year contract expired and was not renewed.

International career
Santos earned 30 caps for Portugal at youth level, scoring three times. He made his debut for the full side on 29 March 2011, replacing Rúben Micael for the last 15 minutes of a 2–0 friendly win over Finland in Aveiro.

Club statistics

References

External links

1989 births
Living people
People from Torres Vedras
Sportspeople from Lisbon District
Portuguese footballers
Association football midfielders
Primeira Liga players
Liga Portugal 2 players
Segunda Divisão players
Sporting CP footballers
C.D. Fátima players
U.D. Leiria players
Vitória S.C. players
F.C. Arouca players
Belenenses SAD players
La Liga players
Deportivo de La Coruña players
Süper Lig players
Balıkesirspor footballers
Ligue 2 players
FC Metz players
Liga I players
CS Universitatea Craiova players
Swiss Super League players
Swiss Challenge League players
Grasshopper Club Zürich players
Portugal youth international footballers
Portugal under-21 international footballers
Portugal international footballers
Portuguese expatriate footballers
Expatriate footballers in Spain
Expatriate footballers in Turkey
Expatriate footballers in France
Expatriate footballers in Romania
Expatriate footballers in Switzerland
Portuguese expatriate sportspeople in Spain
Portuguese expatriate sportspeople in Turkey
Portuguese expatriate sportspeople in France
Portuguese expatriate sportspeople in Romania
Portuguese expatriate sportspeople in Switzerland